Restrepia schizosepala is a species of orchid endemic to northeastern Ecuador. It is characterized by cespitose growth, a ramicaul of 8–11 cm in length covered by 8–9 distichous sheaths, and an ovate leaf 4–5 cm long, 2.5–3 cm wide. It produces a single flower that can be distinguished from other members of Restrepia by its synsepal, which is always deeply split.

References

External links 

schizosepala
Endemic orchids of Ecuador